The 2018 FIBA 3x3 Europe Cup was the fourth edition of the 3x3 Europe Championships, organized by FIBA Europe, and was held between 14 and 16 September 2018, in the city's Metropolitan Circus in Bucharest, Romania. This 3x3 basketball competition featured separate tournaments for men's and women's national teams. This was the third time that Bucharest had hosted the championships, after the 2014 FIBA Europe 3x3 Championships at the University Square and the 2016 FIBA Europe 3x3 Championships within the AFI Cotroceni shopping mall.

Serbia won their first European championship title in the men's tournament, by beating Latvia in the final. In the women's tournament, France won their first European championship title by beating the Netherlands in the final.

Qualification

Men

Women

Draw 
Several qualifiers were held across three nations namely, Andorra, France, and the host country itself. The hosts, Romania, qualified automatically for both the men's and women's events. The draw of the groupings was announced by FIBA last 16 August 2018.

Men

Women's

References

External links
Official website

2018
2018 in 3x3 basketball
2018–19 in Romanian basketball
International basketball competitions hosted by Romania
Sports competitions in Bucharest
September 2018 sports events in Europe